Edward Kwame Ababio (born January 1, 1988) is a Ghanaian-American retired soccer player. Ababio is a coach with Tampa Bay United, a youth organization supported by the Tampa Bay Rowdies. Ababio previously coached with Florida Hawks FC, a youth program based in Lithia, Florida.

Career

College and Amateur
Born in Accra, Ghana, Ababio lived for several years in Tampa, Florida where he played for HC United and Gaither High School before joining the US Under-17 national team residency at the IMG Soccer Academy in Bradenton, Florida. He played for the UNC Tar Heels in college where he featured regularly almost throughout his time at the school (he was medically redshirted after making three appearances in the 2009 season).

During his college years Ababio also played with Carolina Dynamo in the USL Premier Development League, and was on the roster of the Bradenton Academics, but did not feature in any games for the Florida team due to injury.

Professional
Ababio was drafted in the first round (18th overall) of the 2011 MLS SuperDraft by the Colorado Rapids. He signed with the Rapids on April 14, 2011.

Ababio made his professional debut in a group stage match on September 28, 2011, in the 2011–12 CONCACAF Champions League, scoring in his debut against Isidro Metapán of El Salvador.

Ababio was waived by Colorado on June 28, 2012.

References

External links
 

1988 births
Living people
Soccer players from Tampa, Florida
American expatriate soccer players
North Carolina Tar Heels men's soccer players
IMG Academy Bradenton players
North Carolina Fusion U23 players
Colorado Rapids players
Tampa Bay Rowdies players
North Carolina FC players
C.D. Águila footballers
Gaither High School alumni
Expatriate footballers in El Salvador
USL League Two players
National Premier Soccer League players
Major League Soccer players 
North American Soccer League players
United States men's youth international soccer players
Colorado Rapids draft picks
American men's soccer players
Tampa Marauders players
Association football defenders
Ghanaian emigrants to the United States
USL League Two coaches